David Murray (28 December 1829 – 6 January 1907) was a politician in South Australia.

Murray was born in Anstruther, Fife, Scotland, a son of William Murray. He and his brother William Mackintosh Murray (c. 1831 – 25 November 1920) had some experience in the retail and wholesale drapery trade, which included supplying retailers in the young colony of South Australia. In early 1853 the brothers arrived in Adelaide , and began operating a retail drapery store in King William Street, which became the wholesale draper D. & W. Murray Limited, then Goode, Durrant & Murray second in importance only to G. & R. Wills.

Murray was elected to the House of Assembly for East Adelaide on 28 March 1870, serving until 23 December 1871. He represented East Torrens from 27 March 1877 to 13 March 1878. Murray was elected for Yatala on 25 April 1881 but was unseated on 28 June after being found guilty of bribery and corruption within the meaning of the Electoral Act of 1879.

In May 1882 Murray was elected to the South Australian Legislative Council, holding the seat until retiring on 14 April 1891.
Murray was appointed Chief Secretary in the Downer Ministry, in succession to J. B. Spence, in July 1886.

He was a foundation member of the SA Geographical Society and a member of the Caledonian Society of South Australia, and its Chief 1887–1888. He is remembered as a patron of the Arts, having bequeathed a large collection of prints to the Art Gallery of South Australia, together with £3,000 for the establishment of a print room.

On 9 May 1856 he married Rebecca Godfrey, they had a son who died young. In March or April 1902 he left for England on account of the ill health of his wife, and never returned.

References

 

|-

1829 births
1907 deaths
Members of the South Australian House of Assembly
Members of the South Australian Legislative Council
Australian art patrons
19th-century Australian businesspeople
20th-century Australian businesspeople
Scottish emigrants to colonial Australia
People from Anstruther
Settlers of South Australia
19th-century Australian politicians
Australian book and manuscript collectors